Dance Teacher may refer to:
 Dance teacher
 Dance Teacher (film), a 1952 Soviet drama film
 The Dance Teacher, a 1995 Czech drama film